2027 in sports describes the year's events in world sport.

Competitions by month

January

May

June

July

August

September

December

Alpine skiing
TBD: FIS Alpine World Ski Championships 2027 in  Crans-Montana

Aquatics 
TBD: 2027 World Aquatics Championships in  Budapest

Association football 
TBD: 2027 AFC Asian Cup 
TBD: 2027 FIFA Women's World Cup

Basketball
17 – 27 June: EuroBasket Women 2027 
26 June – 4 July: 2027 FIBA Under-19 Basketball World Cup 
3 – 11 July: 2027 FIBA Women's AmeriCup 
10 – 18 July: 2027 FIBA Under-19 Women's Basketball World Cup 
11 – 18 July: 2027 FIBA Women's Asia Cup 
23 July – 1 August: 2027 Women's Afrobasket 
27 August – 12 September: 2027 FIBA Basketball World Cup

Cricket 

Cycling – Road 
TBD: 2027 UCI Road World Championships in  Haute-Savoie

Golf 
20 – 23 May: 2027 PGA Championship in  Texas
17 – 20 June: 2027 U.S. Open in  California
TBD: 2027 Ryder Cup in  County Limerick
TBD: 2027 Women's PGA Championship in  Maryland
TBD: 2027 U.S. Women's Open in  Ohio

Handball 
January: 2027 World Men's Handball Championship in 
TBD: 2027 World Women's Handball Championship in

Multi-sport events 
2 – 18 July: 2027 Pan American Games in  Barranquilla
10 – 21 December: 2027 Southeast Asian Games in  Kuala Lumpur
TBD: 2027 Military World Games in  Bogotá
TBD: 2027 Pacific Games in 
TBD: 2027 Parapan American Games 
TBD: 2027 Special Olympics World Summer Games in   Perth

Netball 
TBD: 2027 Netball World Cup in  Sydney

Nordic skiing 
TBD: FIS Nordic World Ski Championships 2027 in  Falun

Rugby union 
10 September – 23 October: 2027 Rugby World Cup in

References

 
Sports by year